Tabor Congregational Church is a historic Congregational church at 403 Elm Street in Tabor, Iowa, USA.

The church was designed by J.K. Nutting, who pastored The Little Brown Church and is similar in design to that church. The church building was completed in 1875. Before its completion, the congregation met in the chapel at Tabor College. The founding minister was John Todd), a prominent abolitionist in Tabor. The church building was added to the National Register of Historic Places in 2011.

References

Churches completed in 1875
United Church of Christ churches in Iowa
Gothic Revival church buildings in Iowa
National Register of Historic Places in Fremont County, Iowa
Churches on the National Register of Historic Places in Iowa
Buildings and structures in Fremont County, Iowa